Bathycheilidae is a family of trilobites comprising the genera Bathycheilus, Calymenia and Eulomina.

References

 
Trilobite families
Calymenina